Kentucky Route 472 (KY 472) is a  state highway in Kentucky that runs from Kentucky Route 80 in eastern London to U.S. Route 421 south of Burning Springs.

Major intersections

References

0472
Transportation in Laurel County, Kentucky
Transportation in Clay County, Kentucky
London, Kentucky micropolitan area